Garipov is a Tatar masculine surname, its feminine counterpart is Garipova. It may refer to

Garipov
Emil Garipov (born 1991), Russian ice hockey goaltender
Ilnur Garipov (born 2000), Russian Paralympic swimmer
Rami Garipov (1932–1977), national poet of Bashkortostan

Garipova
Dina Garipova (born 1991), Tatar born-Russian singer

Tatar-language surnames